This is a list of the first women lawyer(s) and judge(s) in the Territories of the U.S. It includes the year in which the women were admitted to practice law (in parentheses). Also included are women who achieved other distinctions such becoming the first in their state to graduate from law school or become a political figure.

American Samoa

Lawyer 

 Barbara A. Sena Waite (c. 1970s): First female lawyer in American Samoa

Judge 

 Mere Tuiasosopo Betham: First female judge (native-born) in American Samoa (1991)

Public defender 

 Barbara A. Sena Waite (c. 1970s): First female to serve as the Public Defender for American Samoa (c. 1972-1974)

Bar association 

 Barbara A. Sena Waite (c. 1970s): First female to serve as the President of the American Samoa Bar Association

Guam

Lawyers 

Janet Healy Weeks (c. 1970s): First female lawyer appointed to the Guam Bar
Elizabeth Barrett-Anderson (c. 1979): First Chamorro female lawyer in Guam

Judges 

 Janet Healy Weeks (c. 1970s): First female judge in Guam
 Marie Tydingco-Gatewood (1983): First Chamorro female to serve as a judge in Guam (1994) and Chief Judge of the District Court of Guam (2006)
Katherine Maraman: First female justice appointed as the Chief Justice of the Supreme Court of Guam (2017)

Attorney General 

Elizabeth Barrett-Anderson (c. 1979): First female appointed as the Attorney General of Guam (1987-1994; Later elected 2015-2019)
Alicia Limtiaco: First female elected as the Attorney General of Guam (2006)

Assistant Attorney General 

Marie Tydingco-Gatewood (1983): First Chamorro female appointed as the Assistant Attorney General in the Prosecution Division on Guam (1984)

United States Attorney 

 Alicia Limtiaco: First female to serve as the U.S. Attorney for Guam (c. 2010-2017)

Assistant United States Attorney 

 Ellen A. Lockwood: First female to serve as the Assistant U.S. Attorney for Guam (1987)

Bar Association 

 Jacqueline Taitano-Terlaje: First Chamorro female to serve as the President of the Guam Bar Association (2017)

Northern Mariana Islands

Lawyer 

 Deanne C. Siemer (Bar No. F0116): First female lawyer in the Northern Mariana Islands (c. 1984)
 Virginia Sablan-Onerheim: First indigenous female lawyer in the Northern Mariana Islands (1995)
 Ramona Villagomez Manglona: First indigenous female lawyer to pass the CNMI bar exam (1996)
Ellsbeth Viola Alepuyo (Bar No. F0316): First Carolinian female admitted to the CNMI Bar Association (2005)

Judges 

 Virginia Sablan-Onerheim: First female appointed as a Judge of the Northern Mariana Islands Superior Court (1997)
Ramona Villagomez Manglona: First female appointed as a Judge of the District Court for the Northern Mariana Islands (2011)

Attorney General 

 Ramona Villagomez Manglona: First female confirmed to serve as the Attorney General of the Northern Mariana Islands (2002)

United States Attorney 

 Alicia Limtiaco: First female to serve as the U.S. Attorney for the Northern Mariana Islands (c. 2010-2017)

First in a particular region in the Northern Mariana Islands 

 Lucia Blanco-Maratita: First female lawyer in Tinian, Northern Mariana Islands

Puerto Rico

Lawyers 

 Herminia Tormes García (1917): First female lawyer in Puerto Rico
 Nilita Vientós Gaston (1926): First female lawyer to work for the Department of Justice in Puerto Rico

Judges 

 Herminia Tormes García (1917): First female judge in Puerto Rico (1929)
 Judith Seda Matos: First female Justice of the Peace in Puerto Rico (1936-1941)
Carmen Consuelo Cerezo (1969): First Puerto Rican female appointed as a Judge of the U.S. District Court for the District of Puerto Rico (1980). She is the first female federal judge in Puerto Rico.
Miriam Naveira: First female appointed as a Justice of the Supreme Court of Puerto Rico (1985) and its Chief Justice (2003)
Maite Oronoz Rodríguez (2001): First openly LGBT female justice appointed as the Chief Justice of the Supreme Court of Puerto Rico (2016)

Secretary of Justice 

 Carmen Rita Velez Borras: First female to serve as the Secretary of Justice of Puerto Rico (1983)

United States Attorney 

 Rosa Emilia Rodríguez: First female to serve as the U.S. Attorney for Puerto Rico (2007)

Assistant Federal Public Defender 

 Aida Delgado-Colón (1980): First female appointed as an Assistant Federal Public Defender for the District of Puerto Rico (1982). She later served as the Chief Judge of the U.S. District Court for the District of Puerto Rico (2011).

Bar Association 

 Nora L. Rodríguez Matías: First female to serve as the President of the Bar Association of Puerto Rico (1988)
Ana Irma Rivera Lassén: First openly LGBT and Afro-Puerto Rican female to serve as the President of the Bar Association of Puerto Rico (2012–2014)

Faculty 

 Vivian I. Neptune Rivera: First female to serve as the dean of a Puerto Rican law school (upon becoming the Dean of University of Puerto Rico School of Law c. 2012)

Firsts in a particular region in Puerto Rico 

 Isabel Llompart Zeno: First female appointed as an Administrative Judge in San Juan, Puerto Rico (2007)

United States Virgin Islands

Lawyer 

 Edith Bornn (1948): First female lawyer in the United States Virgin Islands

Law clerk 

 Glenda L. Lake: First female to serve as the Clerk of Court for the District of the Virgin Islands (2012)

Judges 

 Eileen Ramona Petersen: First female judge in the United States Virgin Islands (1971)
Maria M. Cabret: First female of Puerto Rican descent to serve as a Judge of the Territorial Court of the Virgin Islands (1987), Presiding Judge of the Territorial Court (2000-2006), and Supreme Court of the Virgin Islands (c. 2006)
Wilma A. Lewis: First female to serve as a District Court Judge for the United States Virgin Islands (2011)

Attorney General 

 J'Ada Finch-Sheen: First female (a lawyer) to serve as the Attorney General of the United States Virgin Islands (1981-1984)

Bar Association 

 Adriane J. Dudley: First female to serve as the President of the Virgin Islands Bar Association (1980)

Firsts in a particular region in the United States Virgin Islands

St. Thomas 

 Soraya Diase Coffelt (1981): First female (and Hispanic American female) from St. Thomas to serve as a Judge of the United States Virgin Islands Superior Court

See also  

 List of first women lawyers and judges in the United States
 Timeline of women lawyers in the United States
 Women in law

Other topics of interest 

 List of first minority male lawyers and judges in the United States
 List of first minority male lawyers and judges in the Territories of the U.S.

References  

Lawyers, US Territories, first
US Territories, first
Women, Territories, first
Women, Territories, first
Guamanian lawyers
Women in Guam
Women in Puerto Rico
Women in the Northern Mariana Islands
Women in the United States Virgin Islands
American Samoa law
Puerto Rican lawyers
Northern Mariana Islands lawyers
United States Virgin Islands lawyers